Hakea cucullata, commonly known as hood-leaved hakea, cup hakea or  scallop hakea, is a species of shrub in the family Proteaceae and is endemic to the south-west of Western Australia. An attractive shrub with unusual distinctive foliage and beautiful large pink, red or deep purple scented flowers.

Description
The young branches are densely covered with short hairs and the flowering stems have dark brown hairs. Often with wavy or finely toothed margins and a prominent mid-vein ending in a point at the apex. The leaves are pale green in colour, more or less overlap, distinctly  cupped around the stem, flowers and fruit.
The perianth is deep pink at the base paler toward the tip. Flowering mainly occurs from August to October.

Taxonomy and naming
Hakea cucullata was first described by Robert Brown in 1830 from a specimen collected by William Baxter in 1824 and the description was published in Supplementum primum Prodromi florae Novae Hollandiae. The specific epithet (cucullata) is derived from the  Latin word cucullatus meaning "hooded".

Distribution and habitat
Hood-leaved hakea is found in the Stirling Range, south-western Western Australia, east to the Whoogarup Range in the Esperance Plains, Jarrah Forest and Warren biogeographic regions where it grows in sandy mallee heath  and occasionally in gravelly lateritic soils.

Conservation
Hakea cucullata  is classified as "not threatened" by the Western Australian Government Department of Parks and Wildlife.

Use in horticulture
Scallop hakea is reasonably hardy as a garden plant and has been grown successfully on Kangaroo Island. It is easily propagated from seed and has been successfully grafted onto Hakea salicifolia root stock.

References

cucullata
Eudicots of Western Australia
Trees of Mediterranean climate
Plants described in 1830
Endemic flora of Western Australia
Taxa named by Robert Brown (botanist, born 1773)